Joannes Theodorus Maria "Jan" Bank (born 10 May 1940, Amsterdam)  is a Dutch historian. He was one of the members of the independent committee assigned responsibility for the fourteenth and final volume of Loe de Jong's The Kingdom of the Netherlands During World War II.

Bank was a member of the municipal council of Amstelveen for the Labour Party (PvdA).

References

1940 births
Living people
20th-century Dutch historians
Dutch journalists
Labour Party (Netherlands) politicians
Academic staff of Leiden University
Municipal councillors of Amstelveen
Writers from Amsterdam
21st-century Dutch historians